David Copperfield: An Intimate Evening Of Grand Illusion is a tour made by American illusionist David Copperfield. The tour began in 2003 and is currently running at the David Copperfield Theater at the MGM Grand Hotel and Casino in Las Vegas, and around the United States.

Setlist

2003–2007
 Motorcycle Shadow Box
 Thru Steel
 Baby Illusion
 Squeezebox
 Anthrax
 Lotto Prediction
 Slo-Mo Duck
 Portal
 Thirteen

2007–2014

 Motorcycle Shadow Box
 Thru Steel
 Air Coppers
 Dancing Ties
 Squeezebox

Intermission: Fires Of Passion Video

 Anthrax
 Lotto Prediction
 Slo-Mo Duck
 Floating Rose
 The Fan
 Thirteen

2014–2018

 Motorcycle Shadow Box
 Marcus Levitation
 Lincoln Convertible Car Illusion
 Balloon
 Words
 Floating Rose
 Blu / UFO illusions
 Email From The Future
 Frank Appearance

2019-Present
 Motorcycle Shadow Box
 Marcus Levitation
 Lincoln Convertible Car Illusion
 Star Spangled Banner Illusion
 Words
 Floating Rose
 Blu / UFO illusions
 Email From The Future
 Frank the T-REX

Additional notes

 The Baby Illusion was removed around summer–fall 2007.
 The Dancing Ties Illusion was removed around summer 2012 and replaced with the E-mail From the Future Illusion.
 The Lotto Prediction includes the magical appearance of Copperfield's grandfather's 1954 Lincoln Convertible. It may not be performed on some nights due to stage space or limited backstage room.
 Portal was out of the show in the summer of 2007, returned in the winter of 2007, left in the spring of 2008, and hasn't been performed since. The Fan, an illusion from Copperfield's special "Unexplained Forces" in 1995, replaced Portal. Thirteen was recently removed and was replaced by a Jurassic Park scale illusion.
 Thru Steel, Baby Illusion, Anthrax, Lotto Prediction/Lincoln Convertible Car Illusion, Marcus Levitation, Balloon, Words, Blu/UFO Illusion, E-mail From the Future, and Frank Appearance haven't yet been performed in Copperfield's TV specials.

Magic shows